Jianshe, derived from the Standard Mandarin pinyin 'Jiànshè' for the Chinese '建设/建設' may refer to the following locations in China:

Towns (建设镇) 
Jianshe, Chongming County, in Shanghai
Jianshe, Zigong County, in Sichuan
Jianshe, Sanzhi County, in Sichuan
Jianshe, Baiyü County, in Garze Tibetan Autonomous Prefecture, Sichuan
Jianshe, Datian County, in Fujian
Jianshe, Fuxin County, in Fuxin Mongol Autonomous County, Liaoning

Subdistricts (建设街道)
Jianshe Subdistrict, Yakeshi, in Inner Mongolia
Jianshe Subdistrict, Jiaxing, in Nanhu District, Jiaxing, Zhejiang
Jianshe Subdistrict, Shangqiu, in Liangyuan District, Shangqiu, Henan
Jianshe Subdistrict, Zhuzhou, in Lusong District, Zhuzhou, Hunan
Jianshe Subdistrict, Guangzhou, in Yuexiu District, Guangzhou, Guangdong
Jianshe Subdistrict, Zhanjiang, in Xiashan District, Zhanjiang, Guangdong
Jianshe Subdistrict, Jiayuguan City, in Jiayuguan City, Gansu

Village (建设村) 
Liuji, Liuji, Dawu County, Xiaogan, Hubei